The Journal of Entrepreneurship is a forum for discussion of issues that bear upon and enfold the field of entrepreneurship. The journal advances the understanding of entrepreneurship phenomenon across different national and cultural contexts.

It is published twice a year by SAGE Publications in association with Entrepreneurship Development Institute of India.

This journal is a member of the Committee on Publication Ethics (COPE).

Abstracting and indexing 
The Journal of Entrepreneurship is abstracted and indexed in:
  ProQuest: International Bibliography of the Social Sciences (IBSS)
  EconLit
 SCOPUS
 DeepDyve
 Portico
 EBSCO
 OCLC
 Ohio
 Australian Business Deans Council
 J-Gate

External links
 
 Homepage

References
 http://www.ediindia.org/
 http://publicationethics.org/members/journal-entrepreneurship

SAGE Publishing academic journals
Biannual journals
Business and management journals
Publications established in 1992
English-language journals